Floridablanca may refer to:

 José Moñino, 1st Count of Floridablanca (1728–1808), Spanish statesman
 Floridablanca, Pampanga, a municipality in the Philippines, named after the Count of Floridablanca
 Floridablanca, Santander, municipality of Colombia
 Floridablanca (Patagonia), Spanish 18th century settlement, Patagonia 
 Floridablanca, the ship of the mythical pirate José Gaspar (Gasparilla), supposedly commandeered from the navy of Spain